Haemophilus B and hepatitis B vaccine is a combination vaccine whose generic name is Haemophilus b conjugate and hepatitis B recombinant vaccine. It protects against the infectious diseases Haemophilus influenzae type B and hepatitis B.

A branded formulation, Comvax, was marketed in the US by Merck. It was discontinued in 2014.

References 

Vaccines
Combination vaccines
Haemophilus
Hepatitis B
Withdrawn drugs